The solar eclipse of 27 January 632, also known as Muhammad's Eclipse, was an annular solar eclipse visible in East Africa, Arabian Peninsula, India, and China.

Coverage by Islamic history
The eclipse occurred at the time of the death of Ibrahim, a 21-month-old son of Muhammad and rumours of God's personal condolence quickly arose. 

But he stood at the mosque and said:

References

632 1 27
632
History of Islam